|}

This is a list of electoral division results for the Australian 1901 federal election.

New South Wales

Barrier

Bland

Canobolas

Cowper

Dalley

Darling

East Sydney

Eden-Monaro

Gwydir

Hume

Hunter

Illawarra

Lang

Macquarie

Newcastle

New England

North Sydney

Parkes

Parramatta

Richmond

Riverina

Robertson

South Sydney

Wentworth

Werriwa

West Sydney

Victoria

Balaclava

Ballaarat

Bendigo

Bourke

Corangamite

Corinella

Corio

Echuca

Flinders

Gippsland

Grampians

Indi

Kooyong

Laanecoorie

Melbourne

Melbourne Ports

Mernda

Moira

Northern Melbourne

Southern Melbourne

Wannon

Wimmera

Yarra

Queensland

Brisbane

Capricornia

Darling Downs

Herbert

Kennedy

Maranoa

Moreton

Oxley

Wide Bay

South Australia

South Australia 

Elected members listed in bold. South Australia elected seven members, with each elector casting seven votes.

Western Australia

Coolgardie

Fremantle

Kalgoorlie

Perth

Swan

Tasmania

Tasmania

See also
 1901 Australian federal election
 Candidates of the 1901 Australian federal election
 Members of the Australian House of Representatives, 1901–1903
 Results of the 1901 Australian federal election (Senate)

References

House of Representatives 1901